In mathematics, the metric derivative is a notion of derivative appropriate to parametrized paths in metric spaces. It generalizes the notion of "speed" or "absolute velocity" to spaces which have a notion of distance (i.e. metric spaces) but not direction (such as vector spaces).

Definition

Let  be a metric space. Let  be a path.

if this limit exists.

Properties

Recall that ACp(I; X) is the space of curves γ : I → X such that

for some m in the Lp space Lp(I; R). For γ ∈ ACp(I; X), the metric derivative of γ exists for Lebesgue-almost all times in I, and the metric derivative is the smallest m ∈ Lp(I; R) such that the above inequality holds.

where  is the Euclidean metric.

References

 

Differential calculus
Metric geometry